Benjamin Peter Price (born 17 August 1981) is an English cricketer.  Price is a right-handed batsman.  He was born at Truro, Cornwall.

Price made his debut for Cornwall in the 1999 MCCA Knockout Trophy against Devon.  From 1999 to 2006, he represented the county in 6 Trophy matches, the last of which came against Berkshire.
Price also represented Cornwall in the Minor Counties Championship.  His debut in that competition came against Dorset in 2000.  From 2000 to 2006, he represented the county in 31 Minor Counties Championship matches, the last of which came against Herefordshire.

Price also represented Cornwall in List A cricket.  His first List A match came against Cheshire in the 1st round of the 2001 Cheltenham & Gloucester Trophy.  From 2001 to 2003, he represented the county in 7 List A matches, the last of which came against the Netherlands in the 1st round of the 2004 Cheltenham & Gloucester Trophy which was played in 2003.  In his 7 List A matches, he scored 184 runs at a batting average of 26.28, with 2 half centuries and a high score of 74.

Price currently plays club cricket for Wellington Cricket Club in the Birmingham and District Premier League.

References

External links
Benjamin Price at Cricinfo
Benjamin Price at CricketArchive

1981 births
Living people
Sportspeople from Truro
English cricketers
Cornwall cricketers